Callitris verrucosa, also known as the Mallee Pine, is a species of conifer in the family Cupressaceae. It is found only in Australia.
The tree/shrub has a green/grey colour, rigid branches and can reach a height of 8m. The tree/shrub has a slow grow rate.

Description
Callitris verrucosa is a small tree or shrub which can reach the height of 8m. The Mallee Pine is typically multi-stemmed with erect branches.

The plants leaves are 2-4mm, with a conical/rounded surface, and green/grey coloured. The shrub produces cones which are around 3mm long and in singular clusters for males, and approximately 20mm long for females, and occur in a bunch. 

The Mallee Pine is an obligate seeder, and its seeds display serotiny. The species can be negatively affected by intense fires, however it also requires fire to germinate seeds, making it a unique species.

Other names
Other names for the Mallee Pine include, Camphor Wood & Scrub Cypress Pine.

Range and habitat

The Mallee Pine is endemic to Mallee Woodlands and Shrublands around Southern Australia. It can be found in New South Wales, Victoria, South Australia and Western Australia.
It prefers well-drained soils, and full sun. The conifer grows best in sandy-soils, and can commonly be found on sand dunes within its habitat.

Uses
The resin from various Callitris species were used by Australian traditional owners as an adhesive for tools and weaponry. Long, straight branches were also fashioned into fishing spears.

The wood from the Mallee Pine is durable and insect resistant, and can be used for fencing

Conservation
The species is categorised as 'least concern' on the IUCN Redlist.

References

verrucosa
Trees of Australia
Pinales of Australia
Least concern flora of Australia
Flora of South Australia
Flora of New South Wales
Flora of Victoria (Australia)
Trees of mild maritime climate
Trees of Mediterranean climate
Drought-tolerant trees
Taxonomy articles created by Polbot